Gettysburg Battlefield camps after the American Civil War were used by the Pennsylvania National Guard, Civil War veterans, the US Marine Corps, the Civilian Conservation Corps, the US Army, and the Youth Conservation Corps.

References

G. 

C
Closed installations of the United States Army
Military facilities in Pennsylvania
Pennsylvania National Guard
United States military history timelines